Finnlands Lebensraum is a 1941 Finnish propaganda book that was published to support the Greater Finland ideology. It was written by the geographer Väinö Auer, the historian Eino Jutikkala and the ethnographer Kustaa Vilkuna, who worked for the Finnish state propaganda and information department. Nazi ideas were later added to the script by Yrjö von Grönhagen, a Finnish military attaché in Berlin.

The idea of the book was to demonstrate scientifically that East Karelia and Ingermanland are natural parts of Finland by their geography, history and culture and to legitimise their integration into Finland after the German victory in the Second World War. The new eastern border of Finland was defined to begin from the Gulf of Finland and run via lakes  Ladoga and Onega to Onega Bay in the White Sea. An unpublished adaptation of the book also featured the residential areas of Finnic Kvens in the Norwegian county of Finnmark.

The original title of Finnlands Lebensraum was Das geographische und geschichtliche Finnland ("The Geographic and Historic Finland"), but it was changed by the German publisher to fit more into Nazi ideology.

See also 
Lebensraum

References

External links 
Finnlands Lebensraum at the Finnish National Bibliography Fennica

1941 non-fiction books
Propaganda books and pamphlets
Finnish non-fiction books
Finland–Soviet Union relations
German-language works
Nazism
Finnish irredentism
Nazi propaganda